Lindneriola is a genus of parasitic flies in the family Tachinidae.

Species
Lindneriola paradoxa Mesnil, 1959

Distribution
Tanzania.

References

Diptera of Africa
Monotypic Brachycera genera
Exoristinae
Tachinidae genera